Camilla Hedberg Bertrand (born 5 February 1993) is a professional golfer from Spain. She won the 2013 European Ladies' Team Championship and has played on the Ladies European Tour.

Amateur career
Hedberg was born in Barcelona to a Swedish father and Spanish mother. She had a successful amateur career, was ranked number one amateur in Spain and several times national champion. She representing her country at an international level, including at the 2012 Espirito Santo Trophy in Turkey, where her team finished tied fifth. She was part of the Spanish team that was third at both the 2009 and 2010 European Girls' Team Championships, and the team that won the 2013 European Ladies' Team Championship in England. She appeared at the Vagliano Trophy in 2011 and 2013.

In 2012, she won the World University Championship in the Czech Republic and the Spanish National Ladies Championship, two strokes ahead of Nuria Iturrios.

Hedberg studied at the University of Florida in Gainesville from 2011 to 2015 and graduated with a degree in criminology. She competed for the Gator golf team, was the SEC Freshman of the Year in 2012, and won three tournaments her sophomore year. Hedberg qualified for the 2013 Kraft Nabisco Championship, made the cut, and was the leading amateur after two rounds.

Professional career
Hedberg turned professional in July 2015. She joined the Ladies European Tour with limited status and played in only a dozen LET events 2016–2020, spending the bulk of her time in the LET Access Series. She finished the 2018 season ranked 122nd in the LET Order of Merit.

Amateur wins 
2011 Campeonato Nacional Individual, Copa RCG Sotogrande, Valencian Community Amateur
2012 Cougar Classic, Betsy Rawls Invitational, Spanish National Ladies Championship, World University Championship
2013 Florida Challenge
2014 Campeonato de Espana Amateur

Source:

Professional wins (3)

Santander Golf Tour (3)

Team appearances
Amateur
European Girls' Team Championship (representing Spain): 2009, 2010
European Ladies' Team Championship (representing Spain): 2011, 2013 (winners), 2014
Vagliano Trophy (representing the Continent of Europe): 2011 (winners), 2013 (winners)
Espirito Santo Trophy (representing Spain): 2012

References

External links

Spanish female golfers
Florida Gators women's golfers
Ladies European Tour golfers
Sportspeople from Barcelona
1993 births
Living people
20th-century Spanish women
21st-century Spanish women